Mediglia is a comune (municipality) in the Metropolitan City of Milan in the Italian region Lombardy, located about  southeast of Milan.

References

External links
 Official website

Cities and towns in Lombardy